Keizō, Keizo or Keizou (written: , , , , ,  or ) is a masculine Japanese given name which can refer to:

, pseudonym Gakken, Japanese dermatologist and urologist
 Keizo Fukuda (born 1974), Japanese musician, member of Hifana
, Japanese triple jumper
, Japanese civil servant and general officer
, Japanese author
, Japanese footballer
, Japanese actor
, Japanese photographer 
, Imperial Japanese Navy admiral
, Japanese animation director 
, Japanese skier
, Japanese singer-songwriter and composer
, Japanese politician and Prime Minister of Japan
, Japanese Go player
, Japanese politician
, Japanese long-distance runner

Japanese masculine given names